Qarah Bagh (also Romanized as Qarabāgh; also known as Qarah Bāghī, Karabagi, and Qareh Bāghī) is a village in Narjeh Rural District, in the Central District of Takestan County, Qazvin Province, Iran. At the 2006 census, its population was 372, in 69 families.

References 

Populated places in Takestan County